Hamish Edward Thomson Irvine (born October 1946) is a British auto racing driver from Scotland. He is best known for his time competing in the British Touring Car Championship. In his debut season in 1983, he finished fifth overall in the championship with his Class B Mazda RX-7. He returned to the series in 1994 with a privately entered BMW 318iS with little success. In 1995 he finished fourth in the Independents Cup with a Peugeot 405 entered by his own SCB Motorsport Team. He is not related to former Formula One driver Eddie Irvine.

Racing record

Complete British Saloon / Touring Car Championship results
(key) Races in bold indicate pole position (1982-1984 in class) Races in italics indicate fastest lap (1 point awarded - 1982-1984 only in class)

† Events with 2 races staged for the different classes.

24 Hours of Silverstone results

References

External links

Living people
British Touring Car Championship drivers
Britcar 24-hour drivers
Nürburgring 24 Hours drivers
1946 births